Nadir's Big Chance is the fifth solo album by Peter Hammill, released on Charisma Records in 1975.

It was recorded shortly after a decision to re-form the band Van der Graaf Generator (of which Hammill was the singer and principal songwriter) and Nadir's Big Chance is actually performed by the reformed Van der Graaf Generator line-up.

The album's songs vary greatly in style, as acknowledged by Hammill in the sleeve notes, which refer to "the beefy punk songs, the weepy ballads, the soul struts".

In a 1977 Capital Radio broadcast, John Lydon of the Sex Pistols played two tracks from the album, "The Institute of Mental Health, Burning" and "Nobody's Business", and expressed his admiration for Hammill.

The album includes two of Hammill's most frequently performed ballads at concerts and radio interviews, "Been Alone So Long" (written by Judge Smith) and "Shingle Song", and a reworking of Van der Graaf Generator's first single from 1968, "People You Were Going To".

The album presented Hammill's first use of the Hohner clavinet D6 keyboard, which featured prominently on the next few Van der Graaf Generator albums (particularly Godbluff).

In the song "Pushing Thirty" (from The Future Now, 1978), Hammill claims that he "still can be Nadir". The Rikki Nadir persona returned in October 1979, when Hammill released a single titled "The Polaroid" under the name, with "The Old School Tie" from pH7 as the B-side. It was included on some American pressings of pH7.

"Been Alone So Long" was re-worked for Hammill's 1984 album The Love Songs.

Track listing

Personnel 
 Peter Hammill – voice, acoustic and electric guitars, Hohner clavinet, piano , bass 
 David Jackson – saxophone 
 Hugh Banton – bass guitar , piano , Hammond organ 
 Guy Evans – drums, percussion

Technical
 Pat Moran – recording engineer (Rockfield Studios, Monmouth)
 Mike Stone – mixing (Trident Studios, London)
 Dinu M'Brela (alias of Peter Hammill) – cover design

References

External links 
 Album information on the unofficial VdGG site

Peter Hammill albums
1975 albums
Charisma Records albums
Albums recorded at Rockfield Studios
Albums recorded at Trident Studios